Liberatore may refer to:

 Adam Liberatore, American baseball player
 Lou Liberatore, American actor
 Tanino Liberatore, Italian comics author and illustrator
 Tom Liberatore, Australian rules footballer, son of Tony Liberatore
 Tony Liberatore, former Australian rules footballer
 Niccolò di Liberatore, Italian painter
 Matthew Liberatore, American baseball player
 Matteo Liberatore, Italian Jesuit philosopher and theologian
 17960 Liberatore, asteroid
Liberatores, the self-selected name of the assassins of Julius Caesar

See also

Liberator (disambiguation)
San Liberatore a Maiella, dedicated to Saint Liberator